Guillaume Faury (born 22 February 1968) is a French engineer and businessman. He is the current Chief Executive Officer (CEO) of the aerospace corporation Airbus SE as well as the Chairman of its civil aircraft division, Airbus SAS.

Career 
Working at Eurocopter (now Airbus Helicopters) for ten years, Faury was the chief engineer of the EC225/H225, being responsible for the heavy helicopter flight tests. He eventually became the executive vice-president for research and development (R&D).
In 2010, Faury became executive vice-president for research and development at car maker Peugeot.

In March 2013 Faury replaced Lutz Bertling as the CEO of Airbus Helicopters.
As the new CEO, he faced the H225 crash in Norway, killing all thirteen people on board and grounding all H225 helicopters used in North Sea oil exploitation for a 15-month period. The sale of the helicopter model to the Polish Armed Forces was cancelled.
Faury restructured the X4 program leading to the H160 medium helicopter development to be introduced in 2019, and launched the X6 development for a fly-by-wire successor to the Super Puma.
He began significant R&D programs like the high-speed X3 Racer and the CityAirbus program.

Faury replaced Fabrice Brégier as Airbus Commercial Aircraft COO from February 2018.
On 8 October 2018, the Airbus Board of Directors selected him to succeed Tom Enders as Airbus CEO, starting from 10 April 2019.
Faury will have to shape Airbus' response to the Boeing New Midsize Airplane, face A320neo production and operational challenges, complete A400M negotiations and address slower-selling models like the A330neo. Airbus Annual General Meeting (AGM) 2022 has reappointed Faury as CEO for next three years. And Faury will lead the company through the recovery post-pandemic of Covid - 19 and develop the environmentally friendly Airbus aircraft fueled by hydrogen.

Other activities
 European Round Table of Industrialists (ERT), Member

References 

1968 births
Living people
Chief operating officers
French chief executives
Airbus people
French aerospace engineers
École Polytechnique alumni
Supaéro alumni
People from Cherbourg-Octeville